The Samsung Galaxy A2 Core is a budget smartphone manufactured by Samsung Electronics as part of the Galaxy A series lineup. It comes with Android 8 Go Edition and is made for the South and Southeast Asian, Middle Eastern and African market. It is available in four colours (Blue, Black, Red and Gold).

Specifications

Hardware 
The A2 Core features a 5.0 inch IPS 540 × 960 qHD display. It is powered by Exynos 7870 SoC with a 1.6 GHz octa-core CPU and 1 GB of RAM
. It is also available with Dual SIM support.

The A2 Core is sold with either 8 or 16 GB internal storage which is upgradable up to 256 GB via microSD card.

Software 
The A2 Core comes with Android 8.0 Oreo in the Go Edition for low-end smartphones with Samsung Experience 9.0. It is upgradable to Android 8.1.0 with Samsung Experience 9.5.

See also 
 Samsung Galaxy
 Samsung Galaxy A series

References

External links 
 

Android (operating system) devices
Samsung smartphones
Mobile phones introduced in 2019
Samsung Galaxy